Colfax Township, Kansas may refer to:

 Colfax Township, Cloud County, Kansas
 Colfax Township, Marion County, Kansas
 Colfax Township, Wilson County, Kansas

See also 
 List of Kansas townships
 Colfax Township (disambiguation)

Kansas township disambiguation pages